Ettan might refer to:

Ettan (football), Swedish third division
Ettan snus, tobacco product